Tony Smith (born 1951) is an American philosopher and Emeritus Professor of Philosophy at Iowa State University.
He is known for his works on capitalism, Hegel, and Marx.

Books
 Beyond Liberal Egalitarianism: Marx and Normative Social Theory in the Twenty-First Century, Leiden, The Netherlands: Brill, 2017
 Globalisation: A Systematic Marxian Account, Brill Press, 2005. [paperback: Haymarket Books, 2009.]
 Technology and Capital in the Age of Lean Production: A Marxian Critique of the “New Economy”, State University of New York Press, 2000.
 Dialectical Social Theory and Its Critics: From Hegel to Analytical Marxism and Postmodernism, State University of New York Press, 1993.
 The Role of Ethics in Social Theory: Essays from a Habermasian Perspective, State University of New York Press, 1991.
 The Logic of Marx’s Capital: Replies to Hegelian Criticisms, State University of New York Press, 1990.
 Hegel’s Logic and Marx’s Capital: A Reexamination (co-edited with Fred Moseley), Brill, 2014.
 Dialectics for a New Century (co-edited with Bertell Ollman), Palgrave/Macmillan, 2007.

References

External links
Tony Smith

Living people
21st-century American philosophers
Iowa State University faculty
Stony Brook University alumni
Boston College alumni
Hegel scholars
Scholars of Marxism
Political philosophers
Philosophers of technology
Continental philosophers
1951 births
Habermas scholars